Ash Point is a rounded low ice-free point forming the southeast side of the entrance to Discovery Bay in the northeast of Greenwich Island in the South Shetland Islands, Antarctica with an adjacent ice-free area of . The area was visited by early 19th century sealers.

Ash Point was charted and named descriptively by the Discovery Investigations in 1935.  Bascopé Point and Rojas Cove were named by the 1947 Chilean Antarctic Expedition respectively for First Lieutenant Juan Bascopé, meteorologist of the expedition, and for Captain Gabriel Rojas, Commander of the expedition transport ship Angamos, and Letelier Bank was probably named after a member of the expedition.

Location
British mapping in 1935 and 1968, Chilean in 1951, Argentine in 1953, and Bulgarian in 2005 and 2009.

See also 
 Composite Antarctic Gazetteer
 List of Antarctic islands south of 60° S
 SCAR
 Territorial claims in Antarctica

Map
 L.L. Ivanov et al. Antarctica: Livingston Island and Greenwich Island, South Shetland Islands. Scale 1:100000 topographic map. Sofia: Antarctic Place-names Commission of Bulgaria, 2005.

References
 Ash Point. Geographic Names Information System (GNIS).
 Letelier Bank. Gazetteer of the British Antarctic Territory.
 Bascopé Point. Gazetteer of the British Antarctic Territory.
 Rojas Cove. Gazetteer of the British Antarctic Territory.

External links
 SCAR Composite Antarctic Gazetteer.

Headlands of Greenwich Island